Rongotea is a small rural village in the Manawatū District of the Manawatū-Whanganui region.

Features

Like most of the small settlements around the Manawatū, Rongotea is surrounded by dairy farms and the township serves as the service centre.

Among the facilities are local businesses, retailers and a few eateries.
,
The township is served by Rongotea School which serves students years 1-8. Glen Oroua school, also years 1-8, is also nearby. There are no secondary schools in Rongotea, so secondary students travel to Palmerston North by bus to get to school. 

Unusual for a township of its size, Rongotea currently has four churches, and during the 1900s there were 7 churches present.

Te Kawau Memorial Recreational Centre is here and is home to the Te Kawau Rugby Union Club.

History
In the late 1860s, the Government put the Carnarvon Block up for sale, along with the neighbouring  
Sandon Block. Two businessmen from Otago, the Hon Robert Campbell and John Douglas, bought the 21,400 acre “Oroua Downs Estate” in the Carnarvon Block.

The land, having been declared a special settlement area was by contract compelled to settlement of at least 70 families. The result was Campbelltown, based on a central square (named Douglas). Later, due to many other settlements in New Zealand called Campbelltown, the township's name was changed to Rongotea. The Manawatū County Council chose this name as it meant "Peaceful place", although local tangata whenua Ngāti Rangitāne claim the name recalls a local respected chief.

Rongotea was the centre of a religious revival in the late 1890s and many churches were built.

Demographics 

The population of Rongotea was 642 in the 2018 New Zealand census, an increase of 15 (2.4%) since the 2013 census, and an increase of 24 (3.9%) since the 2006 census. There were 336 males and 303 females, giving a sex ratio of 1.11 males per female. Ethnicities were 588 people  (91.6%) European/Pākehā, 105 (16.4%) Māori, 9 (1.4%) Pacific peoples, and 9 (1.4%) Asian (totals add to more than 100% since people could identify with multiple ethnicities). Of the total population, 135 people  (21.0%) were under 15 years old, 117 (18.2%) were 15–29, 279 (43.5%) were 30–64, and 108 (16.8%) were over 65.

Awahuri

Awahuri had a population of 2,046 at the 2018 New Zealand census, an increase of 201 people (10.9%) since the 2013 census, and an increase of 279 people (15.8%) since the 2006 census. There were 750 households. There were 1,038 males and 1,011 females, giving a sex ratio of 1.03 males per female. The median age was 42 years (compared with 37.4 years nationally), with 423 people (20.7%) aged under 15 years, 339 (16.6%) aged 15 to 29, 963 (47.1%) aged 30 to 64, and 321 (15.7%) aged 65 or older.

Ethnicities were 91.9% European/Pākehā, 15.0% Māori, 1.0% Pacific peoples, 1.8% Asian, and 2.6% other ethnicities (totals add to more than 100% since people could identify with multiple ethnicities).

The proportion of people born overseas was 9.2%, compared with 27.1% nationally.

Although some people objected to giving their religion, 51.5% had no religion, 35.8% were Christian, 0.1% were Muslim, 0.3% were Buddhist and 2.1% had other religions.

Of those at least 15 years old, 264 (16.3%) people had a bachelor or higher degree, and 375 (23.1%) people had no formal qualifications. The median income was $36,400, compared with $31,800 nationally. The employment status of those at least 15 was that 906 (55.8%) people were employed full-time, 255 (15.7%) were part-time, and 48 (3.0%) were unemployed.

Entertainment 

Every year Rongotea holds their own community Fireworks display. Over the years this show has become so popular people from Palmerston North and other townships close by come out to enjoy the show. Dates can vary but will happen no earlier than October but no later than December 25

The community also holds an annual Santa Parade every Christmas.

Education

References

Manawatu District
Populated places in Manawatū-Whanganui